Kevin Dudley (born January 2, 1982) is a former American football fullback. He was originally signed by the Atlanta Falcons as an undrafted free agent in 2005. He played college football at Michigan.

Early years
Dudley attended Franklin County High School in Brookville, Indiana, and played running back as well as linebacker. In his career, he carried the ball 525 times for 3,296 yards and 45 touchdowns.

College career
Dudley played college football at the University of Michigan. He was the starting fullback for his final two years at Michigan. In his career, he rushed the ball 3 times for a total of 13 yards and had 5 receptions for a total of 32 yards with no touchdowns. He was a 2005 Outstanding Sportsmanship Award Winner.

1982 births
Living people
American football fullbacks
Atlanta Falcons players
Michigan Wolverines football players
New Orleans Saints players
People from Brookville, Indiana
People from Oxford, Ohio
Players of American football from Indiana